Kresno Eko Pambudi (born 14 October 1967) is an Indonesian sprinter. He competed in the men's 4 × 100 metres relay at the 1988 Summer Olympics.

References

1967 births
Living people
Athletes (track and field) at the 1988 Summer Olympics
Indonesian male sprinters
Olympic athletes of Indonesia
Place of birth missing (living people)